Tai Nuea or Tai Nüa (also called Tai Le, Dehong Dai or Chinese Shan; own name: Tai2 Lə6, which means "Upper Tai" or "Northern Tai" or , ; Chinese: Dǎinàyǔ, 傣那语 or Déhóng Dǎiyǔ, 德宏傣语; ,  or) is one of the languages spoken by the Dai people in China, especially in the Dehong Dai and Jingpo Autonomous Prefecture in the southwest of Yunnan Province. It is closely related to the other Tai languages. Speakers of this language across the border in Myanmar are known as Shan. It should not be confused with Tai Lü (Xishuangbanna Dai).

Names
The language is also known as Tai Mau, Tai Kong and Tai Na.

Most Tai Nuea people call themselves , which means 'Upper Tai' or 'Northern Tai'. Note that this is different from Tai Lue, which is pronounced  in Tai Nuea.

Dehong is a transliteration of the term , where  means 'bottom, under, the lower part (of)' and  means 'the Hong River' (more widely known as the Salween River or Nujiang 怒江 in Chinese) (Luo 1998).

Dialects
Zhou (2001:13) classifies Tai Nuea into the Dehong (德宏) and Menggeng (孟耿) dialects. Together, they add up to a total of 541,000 speakers.

Dehong dialect 德宏土语: 332,000 speakers
Dehong Prefecture 德宏州: Mangshi 芒市, Yingjiang 盈江, Lianghe 梁河, Longchuan 陇川, Ruili 瑞丽, Wanding 畹町
Baoshan District 保山地区: Baoshan 保山, Tengchong 腾冲, Longling 龙陵, Shidian 施甸
Menggeng dialect 孟耿土语: 209,000 speakers
Pu'er City 普洱市 / Simao District 思茅地区:  Menglian 孟连, Jinggu 景谷, Lancang 澜沧, Zhenyuan 镇沅, Ximeng 西盟, Jingdong 景东, Simao 思茅, Pu'er 普洱, Mojiang 墨江
Baoshan District 保山地区: Changning 昌宁
Lincang District 临沧地区: Gengma 耿马, Lincang 临沧, Shuangjiang 双江, Cangyuan 沧源, Yongde 永德, Zhenkang 镇康, Yunxian 云县, Fengqing 风庆. A separate traditional script has been developed in Mengding Township 勐定镇, Lincang 临沧, and is different from the one used in the Dehong area — see Zhou (2001:371).

Ethnologue also recognizes Tai Long of Laos as a separate language. It is spoken by 4,800 people (as of 2004) in Luang Prabang Province, Laos.

Phonology 
Tai Nuea is a tonal language with a very limited inventory of syllables with no consonant clusters. 16 syllable-initial consonants can be combined with 84 syllable finals and six tones.

Consonants

Initials

* occur in loanwords

Finals

Vowels and diphthongs 
Tai Nuea has ten vowels and 13 diphthongs:

Tai Nuea's diphthongs are

Tones 
Tai Nuea has six tones:
 rising  (24)
 high falling  (53) or high level  (55)
 low level  (11)
 low falling  (31)
 mid falling  (43) or high falling  (53)
 mid level  (33)

Syllables with p, t, k as final consonants can have only one of three tones (1., 3., or 5.).

Writing system 

The Tai Le script is closely related to other Southeast-Asian writing systems such as the Thai script and is thought to date back to the 14th century.

The original Tai Nuea spelling did not generally mark tones and failed to distinguish several vowels. It was reformed to make these distinctions, and diacritics were introduced to mark tones. The resulting writing system was officially introduced in 1956. In 1988, the spelling of tones was reformed; special tone letters were introduced instead of the earlier Latin diacritics.

The modern script has a total of 35 letters, including the five tone letters.

The transcription below is given according to the Unicode tables.

Consonants

Vowels and diphthongs
Consonants that are not followed by a vowel letter are pronounced with the inherent vowel [a]. Other vowels are indicated with the following letters:

Diphthongs are formed by combining some vowel letters with the consonant  [w] and some vowel letters with ᥭ [ai]/[j].

Tones
In the Thai and Tai Lü writing systems, the tone value in the pronunciation of a written syllable depends on the tone class of the initial consonant, vowel length and syllable structure. In contrast, the Tai Nuea writing system has a very straightforward spelling of tones, with one letter (or diacritic) for each tone.

Tone marks were presented via the third reform (1963) as diacritics. Then the fourth reform (1988) changed them into tone letters. A tone mark is put at the end of syllable whatever it is consonant or vowel. Examples in the table show the syllable [ta] in different tones.

The sixth tone (mid level) is not marked. And if a syllable with -p, -t, -k finals having the fifth tone, the tone mark is not written.

Grammar

Pronouns

Syntax 
Tai Nuea uses an SVO word order.

Adverb

Text sample

Language use 
Tai Nuea has official status in some parts of Yunnan (China), where it is used on signs and in education. Yunnan People's Radio Station (Yúnnán rénmín guǎngbō diàntái 云南人民广播电台) broadcasts in Tai Nuea. On the other hand, however, very little printed material is published in Tai Nuea in China. However, many signs of roads and stores in Mangshi are in Tai Nuea.

In Thailand, a collection of 108 proverbs was published with translations into Thai and English.

References

External links

 Tai Dehong
 Dehong Daiwen jianjie ji zifuji 德宏傣文简介及字符集 (Introduction to Dehong Dai with examples; in Chinese)
 Daiyu, Daiwen 傣语、傣文 (in Chinese)
 Yunnan sheng yuyan wenzi wang 云南省语言文字网 (Yunnan province language and writing web; in Chinese)

Southwestern Tai languages
Brahmic scripts
Languages of China
Languages of Myanmar
Languages of Thailand